Girl from Hanoi is a 1974 Vietnamese drama film directed by Hải Ninh. It was entered into the 9th Moscow International Film Festival where it won a Diploma. It also won the Golden Lotus at the 3rd Vietnam Film Festival.

Plot
The plot of the film revolves around a young girl searching for her father, a soldier in the PAVN, after her mother and sister are killed during Christmas Bombings. The film makes significant use of visual imagery and depicts war-time life in Hanoi under the aegis of the most intense sustained bombing campaign during the war.

Cast
 Thế Anh
 Xuan Kim
 Lan Huong Nguyen
 Tu Thanh
 Tra Giang

Production
This film was made during Operation Linebacker II during the Vietnam War, and extensive use of war-time scenery is used depicting war-time Hanoi.

See also
 Vietnam War in film

References

External links
 

1974 drama films
1970s historical drama films
Vietnamese-language films
Vietnam War films
Vietnamese historical drama films